Kal-e Sefid (also Romanized as Kal-e Sefīd and Kal Sefīd; also known as Kal-Esbi is a village in Aramu Rural District, in the Central District of Darreh Shahr County, Ilam Province, Iran. At the 2006 census, its population was 204, in 40 families. The village is populated by Kurds and Lurs.

References 

Populated places in Darreh Shahr County
Kurdish settlements in Ilam Province
Luri settlements in Ilam Province